Kate Denning (born 14 December 1989) is an Australian field hockey player.

Personal life
Denning was born and raised in South Perth, Western Australia. Her mother is a former Australian international player and Olympic gold medallist, Elspeth Denning.

She studied medicine at the University of Western Australia, and is now a fully qualified doctor.

Career

State level
Until 2018, Denning represented her home state, Western Australia, in domestic competitions. In 2019, she was named in the Adelaide Fire women's team for the inaugural tournament of Australia's new domestic competition, Hockey One.

National teams

Under–21
In 2007, Denning was first named in the Australia U–21 side, 'The Jillaroos'. She followed this up with a number of appearances for the side, her final game at the 2009 Junior World Cup in Boston, Massachusetts.

Hockeyroos
Denning made her senior international debut for the Hockeyroos in 2009, during a test match against Germany in Perth, Western Australia.

Following her 2009 debut, Denning did not make another appearance for the team until 2014. She was named in the preliminary squad for the Champions Trophy, but only appeared in a test series against New Zealand in Wellington, New Zealand.

References

External links
 
 

1989 births
Living people
Australian female field hockey players
Female field hockey midfielders
21st-century Australian women